The 1959–60 season was Mansfield Town's 22nd season in the Football League and 2nd season in Third Division, they finished in 22nd position with 36 points and were relegated to the Fourth Division.

Final league table

Results

Football League Third Division

FA Cup

Squad statistics
 Squad list sourced from

References
General
 Mansfield Town 1959–60 at soccerbase.com (use drop down list to select relevant season)

Specific

Mansfield Town F.C. seasons
Mansfield Town